Coloni may refer to:
 Coloni (ancient Rome), late Roman tenant farmers
 Scuderia Coloni, a motor racing team
 Sharecroppers
 Qalunya, older name of this depopulated Palestinian village